Thomas Michell  (by 1492 – will proven 1551), of Worth, Sussex, was an English politician.

He was a Member (MP) of the Parliament of England for Reigate in 1529.

References

15th-century births
1551 deaths
English MPs 1529–1536
People from Worth, West Sussex